Alludu Adhurs is a 2021 Indian Telugu-language action comedy film written and directed by Santosh Srinivas and produced by Gorrela Subrahmanyam. The film stars Bellamkonda Sreenivas, Nabha Natesh, Anu Emmanuel, Sonu Sood and Prakash Raj. The film was released on 15 January 2021 coinciding with Sankranthi. The film received negative reviews from critics and audiences and became a box office flop.

Plot 
Sreenu meets Vasu at school and falls in love with her. They become close friends and later she leaves. After which he and his friends vow to never fall for girls.

20 years later he meets Vasu at a business meeting, later he learns she is in love with Gaja, her father's enemy, who wants to avenge his father and sister's death with his uncle Brahmaji.Before that Sreenu falls in love with Koumadi.While helping his friend from Koumadi's father as he proposed Koumadi and learns she is sister of Vasu

It is later revealed that Vasu tried to commit suicide but was saved by some villagers and then taken home. Even though she learns that Gaja was only using her for his revenge, she believes that he loves her, so Seenu acts as if he was possessed by Vasu's ghost, as everyone believes she is dead. After a series of incidents, Gaja and Vasu, along with Seenu and Koumudi get married.

Cast

Production 
Principal photography of the film began in January 2020. Later in March 2020, a promotional poster was released announcing the film's release on 30 April 2020. But due to the COVID-19 lockdown in India, the filming was paused. The filming was then resumed in September 2020. In December 2020, the film was announced to be releasing on 14 January 2021.

Soundtrack

Release 
The film was released on 15 January 2021 coinciding with Sankranthi, alongside other Telugu films including Krack and Red.

Reception
In his review for Firstpost, Hemanth Kumar rated the film 1 of 5 and termed it, "silly, outdated, and a nonsensical film." The Hindu critic Sangeetha Devi wrote: "The writer has weaved multiple sub-plots to fill the two-and-a-half-hour slot. The story appears tailor-made for the front-benchers and one feels a sense of deja vu at the comedy." The Times of India which rated 2.5 stars out of five, stated: "A film with too many elements and very litle substance, Alludu Adhurs is letdown by its predictability"

The film was later dubbed and released in Tamil as Maanbumigu Marumagan.

References

External links 

 

2020s Telugu-language films
2021 films
Films scored by Devi Sri Prasad
Films set in Andhra Pradesh
Films shot in Hyderabad, India
Film productions suspended due to the COVID-19 pandemic
2021 action comedy films
Indian action comedy films
2020s masala films
Films directed by Santosh Srinivas